Several ships of the Royal Navy have borne the name HMS Royal James:

 , a 70-gun second-rate ship of the line launched in 1658 as the Richard, renamed in 1660 when she was reclassed as a first rate, and burnt by the Dutch in 1667.
 , a 100-gun first-rate ship of the line launched in 1671, and burnt in action in 1672.
 , a 100-gun first-rate ship of the line launched in 1675, renamed HMS Victory in 1691, rebuilt in 1695 and destroyed by fire in 1721.

See also
 Stede Bonnet and Edward England, two 18th-century pirates whose ships were named Royal James.

References

Royal Navy ship names